Lamu East Constituency is an electoral constituency in Kenya. It is one of two constituencies in Lamu County. The constituency has six wards, all electing councillors for the Lamu County Council.

Members of Parliament

Locations and wards

References

External links 
Map of the constituency

Constituencies in Lamu County
Constituencies in Coast Province